Quilley is a surname. Notable people with the surname include:

 Denis Quilley (1927–2003), English actor and singer
 Geoffrey Quilley (born 1961), British art historian

See also
 Quigley
 Quilly (disambiguation)

English-language surnames